Apomyelois artonoma is a species of snout moth in the genus Apomyelois. It was described by Edward Meyrick in 1935. It is found on Java in Indonesia.

References

Moths described in 1935
Phycitini
Moths of Indonesia